Pleomeliola is a genus of fungi within the Meliolaceae family.

References

External links
Pleomeliola at Index Fungorum

Meliolaceae